The 13281 / 13282 New Tinsukia–Rajendra Nagar Weekly Express is an Express train belonging to East Central Railway zone that runs between  and  in India. It is currently being operated with 13281/13282 train numbers on a weekly basis.

Service

The 13281/New Tinsukia–Rajendra Nagar Weekly Express has an average speed of 46 km/hr and covers 1445 km in 31h 30m. The 13282/Rajendra Nagar (Patna)–New Tinsukia Weekly Express has an average speed of 46 km/hr and covers 1445 km in 31h 30m.

Route & halts

The important halts of the train are:

ASSAM
 
 Duliajan
 Naharkatiya
 Namrup
 Simaluguri
 
 
 
 
 
 
 Jagiroad
 
 
 Goalpara
 
 

NAGALAND
 

WEST BENGAL
 
 
 
 
 New Jalpaiguri (Siliguri)

BIHAR

Coach composition

The train has standard LHB rakes with max speed of 130 kmph. The train consists of 23 coaches:

 1 First AC and Second AC
 1 AC II Tier
 3 AC III Tier
 1 Pantry car
 11 Sleeper coaches
 3 General
 2 Head-on Generation

Traction

Rake sharing  

The train shares its rake with 12395/12396 Ziyarat Express.

See also 

 Rajendra Nagar Terminal railway station
 New Tinsukia Junction railway station
 Dibrugarh-Chandigarh Express
 Ziyarat Express

Notes

External links 

 13281/New Tinsukia - Rajendra Nagar Weekly Express India Rail Info
 13282/Rajendra Nagar - New Tinsukia Weekly Express India Rail Info

References 

Transport in Patna
Transport in Tinsukia
Express trains in India
Rail transport in Assam
Rail transport in Nagaland
Rail transport in West Bengal
Rail transport in Bihar
Rail transport in Uttar Pradesh